Simón Bolívar University is a private Roman Catholic university in Mixcoac, Benito Juárez, Mexico City. Currently, it teaches 15 bachelor's programmes, 8 master's degree programmes and one specialty. It is named after Venezuelan military and political leader Simón Bolívar.

History 
The university began in 1944 when the Franciscan Sisters of the Immaculate Conception started an education project beginning from the basic levels of learning; with the creation of the preschool and primary levels, the Colegio Simón Bolívar (Simón Bolívar College) was founded. In 1952, they opened the Escuela Normal de Educación Primaria (Normal School – that is, a teacher's college – of Primary Education), this being the first programme for professional training. In 1981, Simón Bolívar University as it is known today arose, conferring bachelor's degrees in graphic design and biology, thus becoming the only private university in the Mexico City metropolitan area to award the latter even now. Nowadays, Simón Bolívar University offers 25 bachelor's and master's programmes.

Bachelor's degrees 
 Accountacy
 Biology
 Biological and pharmaceutical Chemistry
 Biotechnology
 Business Information Technology
 Business Administration
 Clinical Biochemistry
 Communication and Multimedia
 Food Engineering
 International Trade and Customs Management
 Law
 Marketing and Commercial Relations
 Pedadogy
 Telecommunications Engineering
 Visual Communication Design

Master's degrees 
 Administrative Sciences
 Communication for Political and Social Action
 Computer Science and Technology Administration
 Environmental Science
 Multimedia Project Design
 Productivity and Quality Systems Administration
 University-level Teaching
 Visual Communication

Specialty 
 Specialty in Web Design

Campus 
The main building, housing the rector's office along with some administrative offices, dates from the 18th century, and is one of the zone's protected residences.

Library 
The university's library can be found in a big house that dates from colonial times in which, later, General José Joaquín de Herrera installed his provisional government in 1848, during the Mexican–American War, thus making the building into a national historic monument.

References

External links
 Simon Bolivar University website—

Universities in Mexico City
Benito Juárez, Mexico City